Ek Gaon Ki Kahani is a Bollywood movie directed by Dulal Guha which was released in the year 1957. The star cast was Talat Mehmood, Nirupa Roy, Mala Sinha etc. The movie was producer by Basu Chitra Mandir. The music director was Salil Choudhury, Lyricist was Shailendra and the playback singers were Lata Mangeshkar, Asha Bhosle, Talat Mehmood and Manna Dey.

Cast  
Mala Sinha as Jaya 
Abhi Bhattacharya as Ratan
Nirupa Roy as Maya
Talat Mahmood as Doctor
I. S. Johar as Gokul
Bipin Gupta as Dayashankar
Lalita Pawar as Ratan's Mother
Brahm Bhardwaj (as Bhardwaj)
Mohan Choti
Dhumal as Bansi
Dulari as Dayashankar's sister
C. S. Dubey
Baby Honey

Soundtrack
All songs were composed by Salil Chowdhury and penned by Shailendra.

"Raat Ne Kya Kya Khavab Dikhaye" - Talat Mahmood
"Jhoome Re, Nilaa Ambar Jhume, Dharti Ko Chume Re" - Talat Mahmood
"O Haay Koi Dekh Lega" - Lata Mangeshkar, Talat Mahmood
"Bole Pihu Pihu Papihara" - Lata Mangeshkar
"Din Holi Ka Aa Gaya Rang Dalo" - Manna Dey, Lata Mangeshkar
"Chale Thumak Thumak Taare" - Lata Mangeshkar
"Kaanha Kubda Langra Loola" - Asha Bhosle

References

External links
 

1957 films
1950s Hindi-language films